Salem is a city in Utah County, Utah. It is part of the Provo–Orem metropolitan area. The population was 9,298 at the time of the 2020 U.S. census.  Landmark locations in Salem include the Dream Mine of John Hyrum Koyle and the Salem Pond.

History

Known as "Summer Spring" by the Indians, and "Pond Town" by early settlers. Pond Town was first settled in 1851.

Salem was later named after New Salem, Massachusetts, the birthplace of Lyman Curtis, to honor his contributions to the community. Curtis was good with a gun and a bodyguard for Joseph Smith. He was later among the earliest Latter-day Saint settlers in Utah. Curtis also was important in central Utah for founding a lumber mill and being involved in important irrigation efforts.

Salem Days 
Salem Days is a week-long city celebration held in either the first or second week of August every year and are a collective of many activities, including a baby contest, car show, cardboard boat regatta, grand parade, firework show, pageant, children's parade, and movie in the park. It has been going on since 1949 when the Church of Jesus Christ of Latter-day Saints asked the cities of Utah to celebrate their towns yearly.

Demographics

As of the census of 2000, there were 4,372 people, 1,128 households, and 1,009 families residing in the city. The population density was 825.0 people per square mile (318.5/km2). There were 1,166 housing units at an average density of 220.0 per square mile (84.9/km2). The racial makeup of the city was 97.07% White, 0.07% African American, 0.09% Native American, 0.14% Asian, 0.27% Pacific Islander, 1.40% from other races, and 0.96% from two or more races. Hispanic or Latino of any race were 2.79% of the population.

There were 1,128 households, out of which 56.0% had children under the age of 18 living with them, 82.3% were married couples living together, 5.1% had a female householder with no husband present, and 10.5% were non-families. 9.7% of all households were made up of individuals, and 5.1% had someone living alone who was 65 years of age or older. The average household size was 3.86 and the average family size was 4.14.

In the city, the population was spread out, with 40.6% under the age of 18, 10.2% from 18 to 24, 25.0% from 25 to 44, 16.4% from 45 to 64, and 7.8% who were 65 years of age or older. The median age was 24 years. For every 100 females, there were 102.3 males. For every 100 females age 18 and over, there were 98.2 males.

The median income for a household in the city was $54,813, and the median income for a family was $57,557. Males had a median income of $40,116 versus $22,798 for females. The per capita income for the city was $16,507. About 3.1% of families and 4.1% of the population were below the poverty line, including 5.2% of those under age 18 and 5.7% of those age 65 or over.

Geography
Salem is located 4.5 miles south of neighboring Spanish Fork, and 3.3 miles northeast of Payson.

Climate
This climatic region is typified by large seasonal temperature differences, with warm to hot (and often humid) summers and cold (sometimes severely cold) winters. According to the Köppen Climate Classification system, Salem has a humid continental climate, abbreviated "Dfb" on climate maps.

Education

Public schools in Salem are part of the Nebo School District. Salem has three elementary schools, one junior high school, one middle school, and one high school. Rick Nielsen is the Superintendent of Schools.

See also

 List of cities and towns in Utah

References

External links

 
 Koyle Relief Mine map, MSS 8030 at L. Tom Perry Special Collections, Brigham Young University. Map of Salem's "Dream Mine."

 
Cities in Utah County, Utah
Cities in Utah
Provo–Orem metropolitan area
Populated places established in 1851
1851 establishments in Utah Territory